"The Hit" is a phrase used to describe one of the most famed plays in the history of the National Football League in a November 20, 1960 game between the Philadelphia Eagles and the New York Giants at the original Yankee Stadium in The Bronx in New York City.

In the play, Chuck Bednarik, a linebacker with the Philadelphia Eagles, tackled Frank Gifford, a running back for the New York Giants, in the game's fourth quarter, knocking Gifford unconscious. He was removed from the field on a stretcher and transported by ambulance to a local hospital, where he was diagnosed with a deep concussion. The hit is considered by NFL analysts and fans to be the most, or certainly among the most, vicious defensive tackles in professional football history.

Bednarik's tackle, which was perfectly legal and drew no penalty, has been widely described over the years as likely the hardest and most vicious tackles in the history of the National Football League. The tackle knocked Gifford unconscious. He was transported from the field unconscious and on a stretcher and then into an ambulance, and some onlookers feared the hit was so severe that it was life-endangering. Gifford was hospitalized for ten days and diagnosed with a deep concussion.

Gifford's injuries forced him to retire from the NFL. However, after undergoing 18 months of recovery, he ultimately returned with the Giants in 1962, before permanently retiring in 1964.

Background

Chuck Bednarik

Chuck Bednarik was one of the last National Football League two-way players. As the league developed, it became too physically demanding for most players to play both offense and defense and the two-way system was incrementally phased out with Bednarik being the last NFL player still playing two-ways.

Even before the hit, Bednarik was widely known known for his toughness and durability, which earned him the nickname Concrete Charlie. Bednarik was the son of immigrants from Slovakia; he played high school football for Liberty High School in Bethlehem, Pennsylvania in the Lehigh Valley region of eastern Pennsylvania. Liberty High School competes in the Eastern Pennsylvania Conference, one of the nation's most competitive athletic divisions with a significant number of the conference's athletes going on to professional athletic careers in the Major League Baseball, the National Basketball Association, the National Football League, and in Olympic-level global competition.

After graduating from Liberty High School, Bednarik joined the U.S. Air Force, where he flew B-24 raids over Germany during World War II, earning an Air Medal, four Oak Leaf Clusters, the European-African-Middle Eastern Campaign Medal, and four Battle Stars. Following the end of the war, he played college football, where he started on both offense and defense, for the Penn Quakers in Philadelphia. He was selected by the Philadelphia Eagles with the first overall selection in the 1949 NFL Draft. Bednarik played his entire 14-year career with the Philadelphia Eagles, playing both offense and defense and missing just three games over his 14-year career in Philadelphia. Following his retirement in 1962, the Eagles retired Bednarik's #60 jersey number in honor of his accomplishments. In 1967, in his first year of eligibility, he was inducted into the Pro Football Hall of Fame.

Frank Gifford

 
Frank Gifford was born in Santa Monica, California and went on to play college football for USC Trojans in Los Angeles. Gifford was drafted eleventh overall by the New York Giants in the 1952 NFL Draft. Like Bednarik, he played for only one team in his NFL career. He was a running back for the Giants from 1952 through the 1960 injury, after which he announced his retirement. In 1962, he mounted a comeback with the Giants before announcing his permanent retirement following the 1964 season.

In 1977, a decade after Bednarik's 1967 induction, Gifford was inducted in the Pro Football Hall of Fame. Following his retirement, he became an actor and sports commentator for Monday Night Football from 1986 until 1997. In 1986, he married television personality Kathie Lee Gifford.

"The Hit"
The November 20, 1960 game between the Philadelphia Eagles and New York Giants at Yankee Stadium in The Bronx was an important one for both teams with first place in the division at stake with its outcome. The game was close throughout and tied 10–10 in the fourth quarter when Gifford caught a short pass and was met almost immediately by Bednarik, whose clothes line tackle dropped Gifford immediately the ground, and he fumbled the football, which was recovered by the Eagles defense and returned for what proved a game-winning Philadelphia touchdown.

As Gifford laid motionless on the field of Yankee Stadium, Bednarik stood over him, raising his arms in celebration in what has become an iconic but controversial image, since it appeared to be excessive celebration of Gifford's injury. Bednarik later said he was unaware of the magnitude of injuries sustained by Gifford and was merely celebrating what was an impactful play that won the game for Philadelphia. Gifford later was also forgiving, saying "Chuck hit me exactly the way I would have hit him. With his shoulder, a clean shot. That’s football."

Reactions
On its 100th anniversary, the National Football League ranked Bednarik's tackle the 44th greatest play in the history of the league.
On November 10, 2010, covering the hit's 50th anniversary, The New York Times called the hit, at the time, "professional football’s most notorious concussion."
In its March 21, 2015 obituary of Chuck Bednarik, New York Daily News wrote: "Chuck Bednarik's hit on Frank Gifford in 1960 was vicious and the picture of Bednarik standing over a knocked out Gifford is iconic, and more than 50 years later, it's still one of the most famous plays in NFL history."

Bednarik and Gifford's deaths in 2015
Bedarik and Gifford both later died the same year, 2015, with Bednarik dying in Coopersburg, Pennsylvania at age 89 on March 21 and Gifford dying August 9 the same year in Greenwich, Connecticut at age 84.

An autopsy was conducted on Gifford's brain following his death, which found that he lived with chronic traumatic encephalopathy (CTE), a disease closely related to repeated head trauma. Dozens of NFL players have since been similarly diagnosed with CTE as awareness of the correlation between head trauma and its onset has grown.  The family released the autopsy results publicly, saying in a statement, "After losing our beloved husband and father, Frank Gifford, we as a family made the difficult decision to have his brain studied in hopes of contributing to the advancement of medical research concerning the link between football and traumatic brain injury...We decided to disclose our loved one's condition to honor Frank's legacy of promoting player safety dating back to his involvement in the formation of the NFL Players Association in the 1950s."

Prior to Gifford's autopsy, 91 other NFL players tested for the disease with 87 being diagnosed positive for it. Gifford's high-profile diagnosis gained broad attention and accelerating pressure on the NFL to take steps to enhance player safety.

External links
"When Frank Gifford was knocked out by one of the most vicious tackles in NFL history," History.com, September 20, 2021
Video of "The Hit" on NFL Films' on YouTube page

References

1960 National Football League season
American football incidents
National Football League controversies
National Football League games
New York Giants
Nicknamed sporting events
November 1960 sports events in the United States
Philadelphia Eagles